Voldemar Päts (19 July 1878, Tahkuranna – 27 June 1958, Toronto) was an Estonian artist, art teacher and politician. He was the younger brother of statesman and 1st President of Estonia Konstantin Päts. He was a member of Estonian Constituent Assembly.

References

1878 births
1958 deaths
People from Häädemeeste Parish
People from Kreis Pernau
Eastern Orthodox Christians from Estonia
Estonian Labour Party politicians
Members of the Estonian Constituent Assembly
Members of the Riiginõukogu
Estonian painters
Estonian caricaturists
20th-century Estonian male artists
20th-century Estonian painters
Academic staff of the Estonian Academy of Arts
Recipients of the Cross of Liberty (Estonia)
Recipients of the Order of the White Star, 2nd Class
Estonian World War II refugees
Estonian emigrants to Canada